Futebol Clube de Lichinga, usually known as Lichinga is an association football club from Lichinga in Mozambique, playing in the top division in Mozambican football, Moçambola.

Lichinga